Mary Myfanwy Piper (28 March 1911 – 18 January 1997) was a British art critic and opera librettist.

Biography
Mary Myfanwy Evans was born on 28 March 1911 into a Welsh family in London. Her father was a chemist in Hampstead, north London. She attended North London Collegiate School, where she won a scholarship to read English Language and Literature at St Hugh's College, Oxford.

From 1935 to 1937, she edited the periodical Axis which was devoted to abstract art. She married the artist John Piper in 1937, and lived with him in rural surroundings at Fawley Bottom, Buckinghamshire (near Henley-on-Thames) for much of her life.

Between 1954 and 1973 she collaborated with the composer Benjamin Britten on several of his operas, and between 1977 and 1981 with composer Alun Hoddinott on most of his operatic works. She was a friend of the poet John Betjeman, who wrote several poems addressing her, such as "Myfanwy" and "Myfanwy at Oxford".

She and John Piper had two sons and two daughters. Her elder son, painter Edward Piper, predeceased her in 1990.

Myfanwy Piper died at her home in Fawley Bottom on 18 January 1997.

Opera libretti
The Turn of the Screw, Benjamin Britten, 14 September 1954, Teatro La Fenice, Venice (based on The Turn of the Screw by Henry James)
Owen Wingrave, Benjamin Britten, 16 May 1971, BBC Television (based on a short story by Henry James)
Death in Venice, Benjamin Britten, 16 June 1973, Aldeburgh Festival, Snape, Suffolk (based on Der Tod in Venedig by Thomas Mann) 
Easter, Malcolm Williamson
What the Old Man Does is Always Right, Alun Hoddinott, 1977
The Rajah's Diamond, Alun Hoddinott, 1979
The Trumpet Major, Alun Hoddinott, 1981

Play
 The Seducer, Søren Kierkegaard play in two acts, based on Kierkegaard's The Seducer’s Diary, 1843

See also
 Piper family

References

External links

Myfanwy Piper — Opera Libretti
Picture in the National Portrait Gallery, London

1911 births
1997 deaths
People educated at North London Collegiate School
Writers from London
Alumni of St Hugh's College, Oxford
English art critics
English opera librettists
Myfanwy
English people of Welsh descent
Benjamin Britten
20th-century women writers
British women art critics
Women opera librettists
20th-century English non-fiction writers